Zoran Kurteš (Serbian Cyrillic: Зopан Куртeш; December 23, 1965 – May 7, 2010) was a Serbian team handball player and coach.

Zoran Kurteš died at the age of 44 after a cardiac arrest in Mamaia, Romania. At the time of his death he was the coach of HCM Constanța, a team with excellent results during his stewardship. He was coaching in Romania since September 29, 2008.

He was married with two children, his family living in Novi Sad.

Playing career
Zoran Kurteš was a team handball player until he became a coach. He played 11 seasons for RK Jugović in the Serbian League.

Coaching career

Clubs
 RK Jugović
 RK Sintelon
 RK Crvenka
 RK Partizan
 RK Vojvodina
 SC Pick Szeged
 Al Ahly
 HCM Constanța

National Teams
 Serbia

Achievements

Clubs
Serbian League: 3 times
Serbian Cup: 3 times
Egyptian League: 1 times
Romanian League: 2 times
EHF Challenge Cup: Semifinals (with RK Partizan)
EHF Cup Winners' Cup: Semifinals (with RK Partizan)
EHF Champions League: 1/8 (with SC Pick Szeged), 1/8 (with HCM Constanța)

National Teams
2003 World Men's Handball Championship: 8th place (with Serbia)

Death
Zoran Kurteš started to feel ill on the evening of  May 7, 2010, in his hotel room in the seaside resort of Mamaia. A friend of his called 112. In about 7 minutes a SMURD ambulance arrived at the Flora Hotel. At 11 pm, after almost an hour  of attempted resuscitation, Zoran died. The cause of death was cardiac arrest.

References

1965 births
2010 deaths
Serbian male handball players
Serbian expatriate sportspeople in Romania
Serbian expatriate sportspeople in Hungary
Handball coaches of international teams
Serbian handball coaches